The Tourist is a graphic novel written by Brian Wood, with art by Toby Cypress, published by Image Comics. The book, consisting of 104 pages in black and white, came out on April 5, 2006.

External links
 Brian Wood's Homepage
 Brian Wood's Blog at LiveJournal

Previews
 Preview at Newsarama
 From IGN, with Brian Wood Interview

Reviews
 Review from IGN
 Review from Ain't It Cool News

Interviews
 With Toby Cypress

2006 books
2006 comics debuts
Image Comics graphic novels